The Horaiellinae is subfamily of moth flies in the order Diptera.

Genera
Horaiella Tonnoir, 1933
†Protohoraiella Curler, Krzeminski & Skibinska, 2019

References

Diptera subfamilies
Psychodidae
Taxa named by Günther Enderlein